Bob Wooley (born February 1947) is an American politician who served as a member of the New Mexico House of Representatives from January 14, 2011 to January 15, 2019.

Education 
Wooley was born in Eunice, New Mexico. He earned a Bachelor of Science degree in agricultural business from New Mexico State University.

Career
Wooley was appointed to the New Mexico House of Representatives by then-Governor Susana Martinez to fill the vacancy left by the resignation of Keith Gardner. In 2012, Wooley faced fellow Republican Representative Dennis Kintigh, who had been redistricted from District 57, in the June 5, 2012 Republican Primary. Wooley won with 1,600 votes (55.5%) and was unopposed for the November 6, 2012 General election, winning with 8,079 votes.

In 2018, he announced that he would not seek re-election.

References

External links
Official page at the New Mexico Legislature

Bob Wooley at Ballotpedia
Bob Wooley at the National Institute on Money in State Politics

Living people
Republican Party members of the New Mexico House of Representatives
People from Lea County, New Mexico
People from Roswell, New Mexico
New Mexico State University alumni
21st-century American politicians
1947 births